Pia Tikka (born 10 May 1961 in Kankaanpää) is a Finnish film director and screenwriter. Her directing works are Daughters of Yemanja (1995) and Sand Bride (1998).

Tikka was one of the screenwriters of The Last Border (1993) by Mika Kaurismäki.

External links 
 
 Pia Tikka homepage

1961 births
Living people
People from Kankaanpää
Finnish film directors
Finnish screenwriters
Finnish women screenwriters
Finnish women film directors